Stanhopea costaricensis is a species of orchid endemic to Central America (Costa Rica, El Salvador, Guatemala, Honduras, Nicaragua and Panama).

References

External links 

costaricensis
Orchids of Costa Rica
Orchids of El Salvador
Orchids of Guatemala
Orchids of Honduras
Orchids of Nicaragua
Orchids of Panama
Plants described in 1860